Many imperial gardens exist in Asia including:

 the old name of the Old Summer Palace in Beijing, China, also known as the Gardens of Perfect Brightness
 the Beihai Park and Zhongnanhai in Beijing, China
 the Tokyo Imperial Palace in Tokyo, Japan